Edward Thomas Highmore (born 3 April 1961) is an English actor. He was born in Kingston upon Thames, London.

Life and career
Best known for playing Leo Howard in the 1980s BBC drama Howards' Way. He also appeared in Doctor Who, playing Malkon in the 1984 serial Planet of Fire. Highmore attended Guildford School of Acting.

He is the father of actor Freddie Highmore, who played Charlie Bucket in the 2005 film version of Charlie and the Chocolate Factory, and Bertie. Edward and Freddie starred together in Jack and the Beanstalk: The Real Story as father and son. Edward's wife, Sue Latimer, is a talent agent whose clients include Daniel Radcliffe.

Filmography

References

External links

1961 births
English male television actors
Living people
Alumni of the Guildford School of Acting